The 18609 / 10 Ranchi–Lokmanya Tilak Terminus Express is a Superfast express train belonging to Indian Railways South Eastern Zone that runs between  and  in India.

It operates as train number 18609 from Ranchi to Lokmanya Tilak Terminus and as train number 18610 in the reverse direction, serving the states of Jharkhand, Bihar, Uttar Pradesh, Madhya Pradesh & Maharashtra.

Coaches
The 18609 / 10 Ranchi–Lokmanya Tilak Terminus Express has one AC 2-tier,  three AC 3-tier, 13 sleeper class, four general unreserved & two SLR (seating with luggage rake) coaches . It does not carry a pantry car.

As is customary with most train services in India, coach composition may be amended at the discretion of Indian Railways depending on demand.

Service

Routing

Traction
It is now hauled by WAP-7 of Electric Loco Shed, Ajni or Electric Loco Shed, Tatanagar from Ranchi Junction to Lokmanya Tilak Terminus towards entire journey.

References

External links
18609 Ranchi - Lokmanya Tilak Terminus Express at India Rail Info
18610 Ranchi - Lokmanya Tilak Terminus Express at India Rail Info

Express trains in India
Transport in Mumbai
Rail transport in Maharashtra
Rail transport in Madhya Pradesh
Rail transport in Uttar Pradesh
Rail transport in Bihar
Rail transport in Jharkhand
Transport in Ranchi